Háblame Como La Lluvia is an album  from Mexican singer Benny Ibarra, released on the summer of 1992. It's his first album and includes the singles "Dame un Poco de tu Amor" and "Tonto Corazón".

Track listing 
"Háblame Como la Lluvia" (Benny, Anahi Van Zandweghe) – 5:05
"Tonto Corazón (Memo Méndez Guiú, Paulyna Carraz)" – 4:23
"Dentro de Ti" (Benny) – 3:22
"El Pájaro" (Benny) – 4:00
"Lluvia de Amor" (J. Sinpoli, Paulyna Carraz)- 4:05
"Dame un Poco de Tu Amor" (Memo Mendez Guiu) – 4:40 
"Solo un Pez en la Mar" (T. Hazell) – 5:05
"Si el Miedo Venciera" (Amy Ray, Benny, Julissa I. de Llano) – 4:50
"Adonde Vayas Tú" (Benny, Anahi Van Zandweghe) – 3:58
"Rincón de Luna (Luis de Llano, Julissa I. de Llano, Luis de Llano Palmer)" – 2:35

Credits 
Benny Ibarra – main performer, background vocals, arrangements, producer, guitars, cymbals, talking drum, setback
Memo Méndez Guiú – background vocals, producer, arrangements, piano
Billy Preston – piano, organ
Pedro Aramburo – programming
Luis Conte – percussion
Abraham Laboiel – bass
John Robinson – drums
Ken Wild – acoustic bass
Everardo Cano – producer
Mariano Rocca – acoustic guitar
Kenneth Barzilai – photography
The Choir:
Benny, Memo, Baby Batiz, Javier Batiz, Francisco Ruiz, Marilú Bano, Paty Tanus, Aureo Baqueiro; Claudia Madrid, Nanso Estevané (Dame Un Poco de Tu Amor, Lluvia de Amor) – chorus

Benny Ibarra albums
1992 albums